Paul Wild may refer to:

Paul Wild (Australian scientist) (1923–2008), British-born Australian scientist
Paul Wild Observatory in Narrabri, Australia
Paul Wild (rugby league), British rugby league footballer
Paul Wild (Swiss astronomer) (1925–2014)